Constantin Bosânceanu (26 August 1966 – 31 December 2020) was a Romanian football defender.

He died at age 54.

References

1966 births
2020 deaths
Romanian footballers
Liga I players
CSM Suceava players
ASC Oțelul Galați players
AFC Rocar București players
Association football defenders